Veliki Rit is an urban neighborhood of the city of Novi Sad, Serbia.

Name
Name "veliki rit" means "big marsh" in Serbian.

Location
Veliki Rit is located in the northern part of Novi Sad between Klisa and Slana Bara in the west, Mišin Salaš and Mali Beograd in the south, Deponija in the north, and Radna Zona Sever 4 in the east.

Population
Veliki Rit is the largest ethnic Romani neighborhood in Novi Sad. Its population numbering 2,500 inhabitants, of whom 70-90% are refugees from Kosovo and south Serbia.  According to another source, population of Veliki Rit include 350 Romani families, of whom 150 are refugees from Kosovo. There are some 30 Ashkali families in the settlement as well.

Organizations

The Society of Roma Veliki Rit is an ethnic Roma organization located in the neighborhood, whose purpose is to cooperate with other Roma societies and to improve economical status of Roma people in the neighborhood.

See also
Neighborhoods of Novi Sad
List of Roma settlements

References
Jovan Mirosavljević, Brevijar ulica Novog Sada 1745-2001, Novi Sad, 2002.
Zoran Rapajić, Novi Sad bez tajni, Beograd, 2002.

External links
Health situation of Roma people in Novi Sad and Veliki Rit
About Veliki Rit (in Serbian)

Novi Sad neighborhoods
Romani communities in Serbia